Greatest Hits Vol. II is the third English greatest hits album released by American singer Gloria Estefan, but is the fourth compilation and twenty-third album overall, released on February 6, 2001 by Epic Records.

Content

Greatest Hits Vol. II is the follow-up to Estefan's first hits album (the second compilation was released only in Europe). The album includes most of her English hits, spanning Mi Terra (1993) up to Gloria! (1998).

The compilation includes three new songs and one new remix. "You Can't Walk Away from Love" was released as the first single from the album and was featured on the 2001 film Original Sin starring Antonio Banderas and Angelina Jolie. "Out of Nowhere was released as the album's second single.` "Y-Tu-Conga", a remix of Estefan's single "Conga, was released as the album's third single. The final new song included is "I Got No Love". "If We Were Lovers" is the English version of Estefan's hit Spanish single, "Con Los Años Que Me Quedan", released from her first Spanish album Mi Tierra.

Estefan's English singles "It's Too Late", "Cherchez La Femme", "Higher", "Cuba Libre", and "Don't Let This Moment End" were not included on the album. "Don't Let This Moment End" was initially included on the track listing, but was removed in favor of "Y-Tu-Conga".

The album peaked at number 92 on the Billboard Top 200.

Track listing

Charts

Weekly charts

Certifications

Release history

References

External links
gloriaestefandiscographydatabase

2001 greatest hits albums
Gloria Estefan compilation albums
Albums produced by Emilio Estefan